Svanstein is a village situated in Övertorneå Municipality, Norrbotten County, Sweden with 207 inhabitants in 2005.

References 

Populated places in Övertorneå Municipality
Norrbotten
Populated places in Arctic Sweden